Zhouping Township, is a rural township in Zhuzhou County, Zhuzhou City, Hunan Province, People's Republic of China.

Cityscape
The township is divided into 20 villages and 1 community, the following areas: Zhaoling Community, Qingshuitang Village, Sizhouzhan Village, Mazhou Village, Honglong Village, Wujiaqiao Village, Shibanqiao Village, Xiqueqiao Village, Zhaoling Village, Xiashi Village, Daguan Village, Tianjiachong Village, Wuyashan Village, Xujiawan Village, Jiangjun Village, Wushilong Village, Beiping Village, Nongkezhan Village, Hetang Village, Jiangbian Village, and Caihuaqiao Village (昭陵社区、清水塘村、泗洲站村、马洲村、洪垅村、五架桥村、石板桥村、喜鹊桥村、昭陵村、霞石村、大观村、田家冲村、乌鸦山村、许家湾村、将军村、乌石垅村、北坪村、农科站村、荷塘村、江边村、菜花桥村).

Historic township-level divisions of Zhuzhou County